Carla Berrocal (born 1983) is a Spanish comics illustrator. She is the president of the Professional Association of Illustrators of Madrid and one of the promoters of the Comic Authors' Collective.

Biography
In 2011, she published her first graphic novel, El brujo (The Sorcerer), in which she explores the magical folklore of Chile. In this edition, Berrocal illustrated "El violador" (The Rapist), one of its most controversial stories.

In 2017, Berrocal exhibited a cartoon mural about black legends in the history of Madrid as part of the City in Vignettes program at the CentroCentro cultural area in Cybele Palace. That June, the Seville City Council chose Berrocal for the creation of the city's Sexual Diversity Month poster.

In April 2018, she participated in the third edition of the LGBT Film Festival at the Oscar Niemeyer International Cultural Centre in Avilés, where she affirmed her lesbian and feminist identity. Berrocal combines her work as an illustrator with teaching: she is a narrative teacher and holds workshops on comics and graphic novels at various institutions. She also has a blog where she expresses her point of view on various topics from the design sector with the aim of transmitting everything learned during her professional career to future artists.

References

External links
  
 Comic Authors' Collective 

1983 births
Artists from Madrid
Female comics writers
Spanish lesbian artists
Spanish lesbian writers
Living people
Spanish comics writers
Spanish female comics artists
Spanish feminists
21st-century Spanish LGBT people